Daniel Auteuil (born 24 January 1950) is a French actor and director who has appeared in a wide range of film genres, including period dramas, romantic comedies, and crime thrillers. In 1996 he won the Best Actor Award at the Cannes Film Festival together with Belgian actor Pascal Duquenne. He is also the winner of two César Awards for Best Actor, one in 1987 as Ugolin Soubeyran in Jean de Florette and Manon des Sources and one for his role in Girl on the Bridge. For his role in Jean de Florette he also won the BAFTA Award for Best Actor in a Supporting Role. Auteuil is considered one of France's most respected actors.

Life and career
Daniel Auteuil was born on 24 January 1950 in Algiers, French Algeria, the son of opera singers. He grew up in Avignon and Nancy, France. He began his acting career in musical comedy and made his film debut in 1972.

Auteuil's starring role in the historical drama film Jean de Florette (1986) and its sequel Manon des Sources (1986) brought him international recognition.  Auteuil has since become one of the best-known, best-paid and most popular actors in France. Through his appearances in films including the swashbuckler Le bossu (1997), the comedy The Closet (2001), the romantic comedy After You... (2003), the thriller Caché (2005) and the comedy My Best Friend (2006), he has since gained greater international recognition.

In 2013, Auteuil was selected as a member of the main competition jury at the 2013 Cannes Film Festival.

Auteuil has two daughters: Aurore Auteuil with his former partner, Anne Jousset, and Nelly from a ten-year relationship with actress Emmanuelle Béart, his co-star in the films A Heart in Winter and Manon des Sources (1986). He married Aude Ambroggi, a Corsican sculptor born in 1977, on 22 July 2006 in Porto-Vecchio, Corsica.

Early life 
At age 16, thanks to André Benedetto, who led a company in Avignon, Auteuil began stage acting in Chekhov's La Demande en mariage. To please his parents he began studies in topography, and he worked in a nightclub cloakroom on Saturday nights to earn money.

In 1969, after attending high school in Avignon, he went to Paris with his friend Roger Miremont. He enrolled in a theater course taught by Cours Florent. Despite several attempts, he was never accepted to compete in the Conservatoire national supérieur d'art dramatique.

In 1970, he made his debut in théâtre national populaire in Early Morning. In 1972 and 1973 he appeared in the American musical Godspell. Partnered with Edwige Feuillère's theater (La folle de Chaillot) and Maria Pacôme's theater (Apprends-moi, Céline), he co-starred with François Périer in Coup de chapeau, which earned him the 1979 Gérard-Philipe prize for the best young actor of the year. He then appeared in Le Garçon d'appartement, which Gérard Lauzier adapted for the cinema in 1982 as T'empêches tout le monde de dormir.

In 1974, Auteuil made his debut on television under the direction of Marcel Jullian in the series Les Fargeot before continuing next to Rellys, Jackie Sardou and Fernand Sardou in Adieu Amélie by Jean-Paul Carrère. In 1977, he played the detective Camaret in the six-episode series Rendez-vous en noir, based on the novel by William Irish.

In 1975, Gérard Pirès offered Auteuil the lead role in L'Agression with Catherine Deneuve and Jean-Louis Trintignant.

Selected filmography

As actor

As filmmaker

Awards and nominations

References

External links

 
 

1950 births
20th-century French male actors
21st-century French male actors
Pieds-Noirs
Cours Florent alumni
Best Supporting Actor BAFTA Award winners
Best Actor César Award winners
Cannes Film Festival Award for Best Actor winners
David di Donatello winners
European Film Award for Best Actor winners
Best Actor Lumières Award winners
French male film actors
French male stage actors
French male television actors
Living people
People from Algiers